Lubor Těhník (12 December 1926 – 3 March 1987) was a Czech ceramist. He used technical earthenware and made a lot of monumental artworks.

Life
He studied Art on Pedagogical Faculty of Charles University in Prague since 1947 till 1951.

Art
He worked in ceramical workshops in Kostelec nad Černými lesy, Štěchovice and Prague.

External links
www.isabart.org/person/1441
leccos.com/index.php/clanky/tehnik-lubor

1926 births
1987 deaths
Czech ceramists
20th-century ceramists